Mummia Achaica was the mother of the Roman Emperor Galba and his elder brother Gaius. She was the granddaughter of Quintus Lutatius Catulus and great-granddaughter of the general Lucius Mummius Achaicus. She died shortly after Galba's birth.

References

1st-century BC Roman women
1st-century BC Romans
Achaica
Galba